Magboi virus (MGBV) is a novel, bat-borne Orthohantavirus discovered in a slit-faced bat trapped near the Magboi Stream in eastern Sierra Leone in 2011. It is a single-stranded, negative sense, RNA virus in the Bunyavirales order.

Molecular virology 

The discovery represented the first time a hantavirus was detected in a bat, although bats as a reservoir for hantavirus had been long suspected. On the basis of a maximum-likelihood phylogenetic tree, the sequence isolated from the Magboi River bat does not cluster with rodent-associated hantaviruses but groups with those found in shrews and moles. This raises the question of the real hantavirus host range. Bats are 
already known to harbor a broad variety of emerging pathogens, including other bunyaviruses. Their ability to fly and social life history enable efficient pathogen maintenance, evolution, and spread.

See also
Sangassou virus
Bat-borne virus

References

Viral diseases
Hantaviridae
Hemorrhagic fevers